Hargrave Jennings (1817–1890) was a British Freemason, Rosicrucian, author on occultism and esotericism, and amateur student of comparative religion.

Phallism and phallicism

In several voluminous works, Jennings developed the theory that the origin of all religion is to be sought in phallic worship of the Sun and fire, which he described as "phallism."

In addition to the works to which he affixed his own name, Jennings is thought by some researchers to have written a number of anonymous volumes in the privately printed "Nature Worship and Mystical Series" series, and possibly also to have written under the pseudonym "Sha Rocco."

As Jennings made clear in several of his books, he used the word "phallic" in its non-gendered sense, meaning "having to do with the sexual organs"; thus he included worship of the female genitalia under the heading of "phallic." In later editions he reluctantly acceded to popular (although incorrect) usage and called his subject "phallicism."

Criticism  
Madame Blavatsky disagreed with Jennings' thesis of phallicism being the origin of all religion.

Blavatsky writes, 

She suggests her own thesis of the birth of phallicism. However she also praised highly his earlier book The Rosicrucians, as well as paying him due credit with such quotes as:

Works
 Indian Religions, or Results of the Mysterious Buddhism (1858)
 Curious Things of the Outside World: Last Fire (1861)
 The Rosicrucians: Their Rites and Mysteries (1870)
 Live Lights and Dead Lights (1873), One of the Thirty, a Strange History (1873)
 The Obelisk: Notices of the Origin, Purpose and History of Obelisks (1877)
 Childishness and Brutality of the Time (1883)
 Phallicism, Celestial and Terrestrial, Heathen and Christian (1884)
 Charon: Sermons from the Styx: a Posthumous Work by Frederick the Great (1886)
 Phallic Objects, Monuments and Remains (1889)

As Sha Rocco
 The Masculine Cross and Ancient Sex Worship 1874; reprinted in the "Nature Worship and Mystical Series  1890
 Sex Mythology 1898 (This was published after Jennings' death, but may be a reprint of earlier writings.)

Anonymous "Nature Worship and Mystical Series"
 Phallic Worship (1880)
 Phallism: A Description of the Worship of Lingam-Yoni (1889) Reprinted as Phallicism (ca. 1890-91)
 Ophiolatreia: An Account of the Rites and Mysteries Connected with the Origin, Rise, and Development of Serpent Worship (1889)
 Phallic Objects, Monuments, and Remains (1889)
 Cultus Arborum: A Descriptive Account of Phallic Tree Worship (1890)
 Fishes, Flowers, and Fire as Elements and Deities in the Phallic Faiths and Worship (1890)
 Archaic Rock Inscriptions: an Account of the Cup and Ring Marking (1890)
 Nature Worship: An Account of Phallic Faiths and Practices (1891)
 Phallic Miscellanies: Facts and Phases of Ancient and Modern Sex Worship, as Explained Chiefly in the Religions of India (1891)
 Mysteries of the Rosie Cross, or the History of that Curious Sect of the Middle Ages, known as the Rosicrucians'' (1891)

Notes

External links
A descriptive bibliography of the privately printed "Nature Worship and Mystical Series" series of books attributed to Hargrave Jennings by catherine yronwode
 
 
 

1817 births
1890 deaths
British occult writers
Esotericists
Pseudohistorians
Rosicrucians